Lahemir (also Romanized as Laḩemīr; also known as Laḩemer, Aḩaymer, Aḩīmer, Laḩeymer, Laḩīmer, Laḩīmer-e Shomālī, Laḩmīr-e Tā‘īn, and Oḩaymer) is a village in Abdoliyeh-ye Sharqi Rural District, in the Central District of Ramshir County, Khuzestan Province, Iran. At the 2006 census, its population was 32, in 6 families.

References 

Populated places in Ramshir County